József Gáspár may refer to:

Jozef Gašpar
József Gáspár (footballer, born 1955)